Sprites or red sprites are large-scale electric discharges that occur in the mesosphere, high above thunderstorm clouds, or cumulonimbus, giving rise to a varied range of visual shapes flickering in the night sky. They are usually triggered by the discharges of positive lightning between an underlying thundercloud and the ground.

Sprites appear as luminous red-orange flashes. Sporadic visual reports of sprites go back at least to 1886  but they were first photographed on July 4, 1989, by scientists from the University of Minnesota and have subsequently been captured in video recordings many thousands of times.

Sprites are sometimes inaccurately called upper-atmospheric lightning. However, sprites are cold plasma phenomena that lack the hot channel temperatures of tropospheric lightning, so they are more akin to fluorescent tube discharges than to lightning discharges. Sprites are associated with various other upper-atmospheric optical phenomena including blue jets and ELVES.

History
The earliest known report of transient optical phenomena above thunderclouds is from Johann Georg Estor in 1730. Another early report is by Toynbee and Mackenzie in 1886. Nobel laureate C. T. R. Wilson had suggested in 1925, on theoretical grounds, that electrical breakdown could occur in the upper atmosphere, and in 1956 he witnessed what possibly could have been a sprite. They were first documented photographically on July 6, 1989, when scientists from the University of Minnesota, using a low-light video camera, accidentally captured the first image of what would subsequently become known as a sprite.

Several years after their discovery they were named sprites (air spirits) after their elusive nature. Since the 1989 video capture, sprites have been imaged from the ground, from aircraft and from space, and have become the subject of intensive investigations. A featured high speed video that was captured by Thomas Ashcraft, Jacob L Harley, Matthew G McHarg, and Hans Nielsen in 2019 at about 100,000 frames per second is fast enough to provide better detailing of how sprites develop. However, according to NASA's APOD blog, despite being recorded in photographs and videos for the more than 30 years, the "root cause" of sprite lightning remains unknown, "apart from a general association with positive cloud-to-ground lightning." NASA also notes that not all storms exhibit sprite lightning. 

In 2016, sprites were observed during Hurricane Matthew's passage through the Caribbean. The role of sprites in the tropical cyclones is presently unknown.

Characteristics

Sprites have been observed over North America, Central America, South America, Europe, Central Africa (Zaire), Australia, the Sea of Japan and Asia and are believed to occur during most large thunderstorm systems.

Rodger (1999) categorized three types of sprites based on their visual appearance.
 Column sprite (C-sprite) – large scale electrical discharges above the earth that are still not totally understood.
 Carrot sprite – a column sprite with long tendrils.

Sprites are colored reddish-orange in their upper regions, with bluish hanging tendrils below, and can be preceded by a reddish halo. They last longer than normal lower stratospheric discharges, which last typically a few milliseconds, and are usually triggered by the discharges of positive lightning between the thundercloud and the ground, although sprites generated by negative ground flashes have also been observed. They often occur in clusters of two or more, and typically span the altitude range , with what appear to be tendrils hanging below, and branches reaching above.

In order to film sprites from Earth, special conditions must be present:  of clear view to a powerful thunderstorm with positive lightning between cloud and ground, red-sensitive recording equipment, and a black unlit sky.

Sprite halo
The halo is centered at about  altitude above the initiating lightning strike. These halos are thought to be produced by the same physical process that produces sprites, but for which the ionization is too weak to cross the threshold required for streamer formation. They are sometimes mistaken for ELVES, due to their visual similarity and short duration.

Research carried out at Stanford University in 2000 indicates that, unlike sprites with bright vertical columnar structure, occurrence of sprite halos is not unusual in association with normal (negative) lightning discharges.
Research in 2004 by scientists from Tohoku University found that very low frequency emissions occur at the same time as the sprite, indicating that a discharge within the cloud may generate the sprites.

Related aircraft damage
Sprites have been blamed for otherwise unexplained accidents involving high altitude vehicular operations above thunderstorms. One example of this is the malfunction of a NASA stratospheric balloon launched on June 6, 1989, from Palestine, Texas. Months after the accident, an investigation concluded that a "bolt of lightning" traveling upward from the clouds provoked the incident. The attribution of the accident to a sprite was made retroactively, since this term was not coined until late 1993.

See also
 Upper-atmospheric lightning (includes Blue Jets)
 Aurora (astronomy)
 Catatumbo lightning
 Cosmic ray visual phenomena

References

External links

 "Red Sprites & Blue Jets" – a digital capture of the VHS video distributed in 1994 by the University of Alaska Fairbanks that popularized the terms
  – webpage by University of Alaska Fairbanks
 Ground and Balloon-Borne Observations of Sprites and Jets
 Darwin Sprites '97 Space Physics Group, University of Otago
 Sprites, jets and TLE pictures and articles
 Sprites in Europe: European contributors blog
 
 
 Short professional bio of Dr 'Geoff' McHarg
 Photography website Petapixel posted a link to a very rare and very clear photograph of a sprite taken by photographer Mike Hollingshead. Article at Photographer Captures Rare Photograph of a Sprite with an Aurora
 At the Edge of Space – a NOVA program that examines the phenomenon of Sprites
 Red Sprites Over Adriatic Sea Seen from the Czech Republic (14 January 2019)

Electrical phenomena
Lightning
Space plasmas
Articles containing video clips